Muhammad Ali Mazhar (born 5 October 1964) is a Pakistani judge serving as a Justice of the Supreme Court of Pakistan since 16 August 2021. He was a Justice of the Sindh High Court from 18 February 2010 to 16 August 2021.

References

1964 births
Living people
Judges of the Sindh High Court
Pakistani judges
Place of birth missing (living people)
Justices of the Supreme Court of Pakistan